Geophilus hadesi is a species of soil centipede in the family Geophilidae, named after Hades, king of the underworld in Greek mythology. This species is found in the caves of the Velebit Mountains of Croatia and characterized by relatively elongated trunk segments and appendages, including unusually long claws of the legs. These centipedes have 33 pairs of legs and can be as long as 28 mm. Like other geophilomorhpans, this species lacks sight, has a flattened trunk, and is well adapted to underground life. Along with Geophilus persephones it is one of the only two known troglomorphic geophilomorphs and can even be found in Lukina jama, the 15th deepest cave in the world.

References

hadesi
Animals described in 2015
Myriapods of Europe
Endemic fauna of Croatia
Cave arthropods